Unión San Martín is a Peruvian football club located in the city of Pisco, Peru.

History

Copa Perú
The Club Sport Unión San Martín was founded in 1948.

In 2016 Copa Perú, the club classified to the Departamental Stage, but was eliminated by Francisco Oropeza in the Quarterfinals.

In 2017 Copa Perú, the club classified to the National Stage, but was eliminated by Binacional in the Quarterfinals.

In 2018 Copa Perú, the club classified to the Departamental Stage, but was eliminated by Santos in the Quarterfinals.

In 2019 Copa Perú, the club classified to the Provincial Stage, but was eliminated by Las Américas in the Semifinals.

In 2021 Copa Perú, the club classified to the National Stage, but was eliminated when finished in 6th place.

Honours

Regional
Liga Departamental de Ica:
Winners (3): 1991, 2017, 2022

Liga Provincial de Pisco:
Winners (3): 1991, 2008, 2017
Runner-up (2): 2010, 2016

Liga Distrital de Pisco:
Winners (3): 1991, 2012, 2015
Runner-up (5): 1989, 2010, 2016, 2017, 2019

See also
List of football clubs in Peru
Peruvian football league system

References

External links
Official Facebook

Football clubs in Peru
Association football clubs established in 1948
1948 establishments in Peru